James Drew (20 January 1872 – 22 January 1944) was an Australian cricketer. He played one first-class cricket match for Victoria in 1900.

See also
 List of Victoria first-class cricketers

References

External links
 

1872 births
1944 deaths
Australian cricketers
Victoria cricketers
Cricketers from Melbourne